Gertrude Maud Robinson (formerly Walsh) was an influential organic chemist most famous for her work on plant pigments; the Piloty-Robinson Pyrrole Synthesis, which is named for her; her syntheses of fatty acids; and her synthesis of δ-hexenolactone, the first synthetic molecule with the character of penicillin.

Biography
Robinson was born on 6 February 1886 in Winsford, Cheshire and died of a heart attack on 1 March 1954. After attending Verdin Secondary School, she was granted her B. Sc. in 1907 and M. Sc. in 1908 from Owens College. She then researched at the University of Manchester under Chaim Weizmann, who later became the first president of Israel, and taught chemistry at the Manchester High School for Girls.

In 1912 she married Robert Robinson, who later won the 1947 Nobel Prize and with whom she coauthored many papers, and moved to the position of an unpaid demonstrator at the University of Sydney before briefly going to the St. Andrews in Scotland and University College in London. She worked on the syntheses of saturated and unsaturated fatty acids and was the first to synthesize oleic acid and lactarinic acid. Her methods led to her synthesis of fatty acids with the greatest molecular weights of the time (specifically, tricontanoic and 13-oxodotetracontanoic acids).

She also independently suggested the asymmetric structure of aromatic  azoxy-compounds and, with her husband, postulated a mechanism for the Fischer Indole Synthesis. Based on this mechanism and working off the pyrrole syntheses of Piloty, the couple provided a method for synthesizing tetraphenylpyrrole . The Piloty-Robinson Pyrrole Synthesis is named in their honor.

After moving to the University of Oxford, Gertrude Robinson began studying plant pigments and published extensively on anthocyanins with her husband. She was the first to observe that the color of a plant’s pigment was not related to the pH of its sap and she pioneered work in leucoanthocyanins. Additionally, she was the first to synthesize δ-hexenolactone, a molecule similar to penicillin that had its antibiotic properties. In 1953, the University of Oxford granted her an honorary M.A. degree.

Besides her work as a chemist, Gertrude Robinson had two children, Marion in 1921 and Michael in 1926. She was an avid mountain climber, a prolific traveler, and a frequent hostess. Perhaps inspiring her work on plant pigments, she and her husband also kept a garden for many years.

Plant Genetics

Anthocyanins and Copigments
Flowers, fruits, and leaves get their pigments from anthocyanins and copigments (such as tannins and flavonols). The combinations provide the exact colors of various plants at different stages of development. The Robinsons found that, at different ratios of anthocyanins to copigments, the copigments had different effects and they postulated that this was due to the copigments breaking up the anthocyanin complexes, which they observed when they were in solution together. They studied these pigments by comparing color distributions in immiscible solutions after reactions with alkalis or ferric chloride.

Leucoanthocyanins
The Robinsons investigated the structure of leucoanthocyanins, colorless molecules that generate anthocyanidins and are present in most plants. Rosenheim simultaneously discovered leucoanthocyanins and he coined the term. Leucoanthocyanins occur in more locations (wood, bark, nutshells, flowers, fruits) than normal anthocyanins.

Piloty-Robinson Pyrrole Synthesis
This reaction, originally named after Piloty, had the Robinson name added to it due to their work on the mechanism. While it is unclear which Robinson the synthesis is technically named after, the paper on the topic was authored by both Gertrude and Robert.

Generalized Synthesis
This reaction is used to convert azines to 3,4-disubstituted pyrroles.

Generalized Mechanism
The mechanism as suggested by the Robinsons.

There are, however, a few problems with some syntheses. The Piloty-Robinson reaction competes with the formation of pyrazoline when the reactant is an aliphatic azine derived from a ketone.  Also, under high temperatures and highly acidic solutions, azines derived from aldehydes are not stable. This prevents the formation of 2,5-disubstituted pyrroles (where R=H) using this method.

Modern Uses
While the pyrroles produced by the Piloty-Robinson Synthesis are often very useful, the reaction itself is not always favorable because it requires high temperatures and long reaction times in addition to the problems mentioned above, the yield is often low or moderate. Modern methods have alleviated some of these concerns.

Microwave Irradiation
Microwave radiation decreases the time necessary for the reaction from around 3 days to 30-60 min. It can also affect the yield.

Solid-Supported
Solid-supported syntheses offer an easier and more efficient workup and purification.

Fischer Indole Mechanism
The Robinsons disproved many of the prevailing theories about the Fischer Indole Mechanism by showing that the reaction went unperturbed in the presence of other aromatic amines such as p-toluidine. This is the mechanism they suggested (where hydrogen shifts may also be interpreted as hydrogen exchanges in acid).

Saturated and Unsaturated Fatty Acids

Methods of Synthesis of Higher Fatty Acids
One of the drawbacks of the Robinsons’ methods for the synthesis of fatty acids are the low yields due to the recoveries of a significant portion of the dialdehyde. The justification by Gertrude Robinson for this low yield was that the aldehyde intermediate was a weaker acid than acetic acid, which was removed during a step in the hydrolysis. While she did not solve this problem, she did improve the yield and decrease the dialdehyde recovered by “the acylation of a substituted ethyl acetoacetate by the group related to the weakest possible acid”.

One example of this is the synthesis of 10-ketotridecoic acid via 13-diketopalmitic acid, which is an important acid because, with reduction and dehydration, it becomes the molecule that is an active ovarian hormone.

Gertrude Robinson, using her methods for the synthesis of higher fatty acids, synthesized n-triacontanoic acid, also known as Melissic acid, and 13-oxodotetracontanoic acid.

Oleic Acid
The Robinsons identified the location of the double bond in, and also synthesized, oleic acid.

The Robinsons’ Synthesis of Oleic Acid

Lactarinic Acid
Lactarinic Acid, isolated from fungi of the Lactarius genus, was shown to contain a ketostearic acid. The Robinsons showed that this was in fact 6-ketostearic acid by doing a Beckmann Transformation on the oxime of lactarinic acid. They then synthesized 6-ketostearic acid via a reaction of ethyl sodio-2-acetyl-n-tridecoate and 5-carbethoxyvaleryl chloride and then hydrolysis to prove the structure of lactarinic acid.

Notes

References

1886 births
1954 deaths
English chemists
British women chemists
Organic chemists
Alumni of the Victoria University of Manchester
People from Winsford
20th-century British women scientists